The 2021 Citizens' Action Party presidential primary or National Citizen Convention will be the primary selection process by which supporters of the Citizen Action Party selected their presidential candidate for the 2022 general elections on 8 August 2021.

The Citizen Action Party will hold its Convention in August, postponing it due to the pandemic.

History
In the Citizens' Action Party, rumors were heard about possible nominations by the president of the Costa Rican Social Security Fund, Román Macaya Hayes and the ambassador to Spain and former vice president Ana Helena Chacón, however, Macaya denied it through a press release and Chacón assured that she could not refer to the matter due to her current position. The Costa Rican Constitution establishes that the President may not run for immediate reelection. Furthermore, Ministers and Executive Presidents of the autonomous institutions have to resign at least twelve months before the election is held in case they wish to run for office.

Inscribed 
Before the deadline in June 2021, the following people have inscribed their candidacy_

 Hernán Solano Venegas, Former Minister of Sport and Recreation (2014-2021), Vice-Minister of Youth (2002-2006).
 Carolina Hidalgo Herrera, President of the Legislative Assembly (2018-2019) from Alajuela
 Welmer Ramos González, Deputy from Heredia, candidate on the 2017 Citizens' Action Party presidential primary.

Withdrawals
Former Mayor of Curridabat and Education Minister Edgar Mora withdrew from the race due to not having the minimal time of membership in the party.

 Edgar Mora Altamirano (:es:Edgar Mora Altamirano), Education Minister (2018-2019); Mayor of Curridabat (2007-2018)
 Marta Zamora Castillo, PAC co-founder, Former deputy from Alajuela (2002-2006)
 Marcia González Aguiluz, Minister of Peace and Justice (2018-2020); Citizens' Action Party president (2017-2018).

Declined to be candidates
 Román Macaya Hayes, Executive President of the Costa Rican Social Security Fund, Former Ambassador to the United States (2014-2018), precandidate in 2010.
 Daniel Salas Peraza, Minister of Health (2018–present day).
 Laura Guido Pérez, Deputy (2018–present day) from Cartago
 Claudia Dobles Camargo; First Lady of Costa Rica (2018–present).
 Ana Helena Chacón Echeverría, Costa Rican Ambassador in Spain (2018–present day), Former Vicepresident (2014-2018), Former deputy from San José (2006-2010)

References

2021 in Costa Rica
Primary elections in Costa Rica
Citizens' Action Party (Costa Rica)